Kathleen Eagle (née Pierson; born November 8, 1947) is an American author of over 40 romance novels.

Biography
Kathleen Pierson was born on November 8, 1947, in Virginia and traveled throughout her childhood with her military family. She has a sister and a brother. She received her B.A. in English literature from Mount Holyoke College in 1970 and her M.S. from Northern State University. In 1970, she married Clyde Spencer Eagle, who is Lakota Sioux. They have three children and three grandchildren, and reside in Minneapolis, Minnesota. Her first novel, published in 1984, was a Romance Writers of America Golden Heart Award winner. She has since won numerous awards including the Romance Writers of America's RITA award.

Awards
This Time Forever: 1993 RITA Awards Best Novel winner

Bibliography

Single novels
Class Act (1985)
Someday Soon (1985)
Georgia Nights (1986)
For Old Times' Sake (1986)
Something Worth Keeping (1986)
Carved in Stone (1987)
Private Treaty (1988)
Candles in the Night (1988)
More Than a Miracle (1988)
But That Was Yesterday (1988)
Medicine Woman (1989)
Heat Lightning (1989)
Paintbox Morning (1989)
'Til There Was You (1989)
Heaven and Earth (1990)
Bad Moon Rising (1991)
Black Tree Moon (1992)
This Time Forever (1992)
Diamond Willow (1993)
Broomstick Cowboy (1993)
Fire and Rain (1994)
Defender (1994)
Reason to Believe (1995)
Surrender! (1995)
Sunrise Song (1996)
The Last True Cowboy (1998)
What the Heart Knows (1999)
Once Upon a Wedding (2002)
Nightwolf's Captive (2003)
A View of the River (2005)
Ride a Painted Pony (2006)
Mystic Horseman (2008)
In Care Of Sam Beaudry (2009)
One Christmas One Cowboy (2009)
Cool Hand Hank (2010)
Once A Father (2010)

American Heroes: Against All Odds Series Multi-Author
To Each His Own (1992)

Night Remembers Series
The Night Remembers (1997)
Night Falls Like Silk (2003)

Last Good Man Series
The Last Good Man (2000)
You Never Can Tell (2001)

Collections
Friends, Families, Lovers (1993)
Summer Sizzlers '97 - Too Hot to Handle (1996)

Omnibus in Collaboration
 Silhouette Summer Sizzlers (1988) (with Barbara Faith and Joan Hohl)
 Silhouette Christmas Stories (1990) (with Annette Broadrick, Brooke Hastings and Curtiss Ann Matlock)
 Silhouette Summer Sizzlers 1991 (1991) (with Marilyn Pappano)
 Brave Hearts (1994) (with Heather Graham and Diana Palmer)
 Mistletoe Marriages (1994) (with Elaine Barbieri, Patricia Gardner Evans and Margaret Moore)
 For the Baby's Sake (1997) (with Mary Lynn Baxter and Marie Ferrarella)
 A Funny Thing Happened on the Way to the Delivery Room (1997) (with Kasey Michaels and Emilie Richards)
 A Mother's Gift (1998) (with Joan Elliott Pickart and Emilie Richards)
 Lakota Legacy (2003) (with Madeline Baker and Ruth Wind)
 Dream Catchers (1989) (with Bronwwyn Williams)

See also
 List of authors by name: E
 List of romantic novelists

References

External links
Author's Official homepage

1947 births
Living people
American romantic fiction writers
20th-century American novelists
Novelists from Virginia
Novelists from Minnesota
Mount Holyoke College alumni
Place of birth missing (living people)
RITA Award winners
Women romantic fiction writers
American women novelists
20th-century American women writers
21st-century American women